This page focusses on decoding of classic first-order Ambisonics. Other relevant information is available on the Ambisonic reproduction systems page.

The Ambisonic B-format WXYZ signals define what the listener should hear. How these signals are presented to the listener by the speakers for best results, depends on the number of speakers and their location. Ambisonics treats directions where no speakers are placed with as much importance as speaker positions. It is undesirable for the listener to be conscious that the sound is coming from a discrete number of speakers. Some simple decoding equations are known to give good results for common speaker arrangements.

But Ambisonic Speaker Decoders can use much more information about the position of speakers, including their exact position and distance from the listener. Because human beings use different mechanisms to locate sound, Classic Ambisonic Decoders it is desirable to modify the speaker feeds at each frequency to present the best information using Shelf Filters.

Some views on the complexities of Shelf Filters and Distance Compensation are explained in "Ambisonic Surround Decoders" and "SHELF FILTERS for Ambisonic Decoders".

There are specialised decoders for large audiences in large spaces.

Hardware decoders have been commercially available since the late 1970s; currently, Ambisonics is standard in surround products offered by Meridian Audio, Ltd. Ad hoc software decoders are also available.

There are five main types of decoder:

Diametric decoders 
This design is intended for a domestic, small room setting, and allows
speakers to be arranged in diametrically opposed pairs.

Regular Polygon decoders 
This design is intended for a domestic, small room setting. The speakers are equidistant from the listener and lie equally spaced on the circumference of a circle. The simplest Regular Polygon decoder is a Square with the listener in the centre.  At least four speakers are required. Triangles do not work, exhibiting large "holes" between the speakers. Regular Hexagons perform better than Squares especially to the sides.

For the simplest (two dimensional) case (no height information), and spacing the loudspeakers equally in a circle, we derive the loudspeaker signals from the B-format W, X and Y channels:

where  is the direction of the speaker under consideration.

The most useful of these is the Square 4.0 decoder.

The coordinate system used in Ambisonics follows the right hand rule convention with positive X pointing forwards, positive Y pointing to the left and positive Z pointing upwards. Horizontal angles run anticlockwise from due front and vertical angles are positive above the horizontal, negative below.

Auditorium decoders 
This design is intended for a large, public space setting.

"Vienna" decoders 
These are so named because the paper introducing them was presented at the 1992 AES conference held in Vienna. The design was covered by a 1998 patent. from Trifield Productions. The technology provides one approach to the decoding of Ambisonic signals to irregular loudspeaker arrays (such as ITU) commonly used for 5.1 surround sound replay.  A slight flaw in the 1992 published papers decoder coefficients, and the use of heuristic search algorithms in order to solve the set of non-linear simultaneous equations needed to generate the decoders was published by Wiggins et al. in 2003, and later extended to higher order irregular decoders in 2004

Parametric decoders 

The idea behind parametric decoding is to treat the sound's direction of incidence as a parameter that can be estimated through time–frequency analysis. A large body of research into human spatial hearing suggests that our auditory cortex applies similar techniques in its auditory scene analysis, which explains why these methods work.

The major benefits of parametric decoding is a greatly increased angular resolution and the separation of analysis and synthesis into separate processing steps. This separation allows B-format recordings to be rendered using any panning technique, including delay panning, VBAP and HRTF-based synthesis.

Parametric decoding was pioneered by Lake DSP in the late 1990s and independently suggested by Farina and Ugolotti in 1999. Later work in this domain includes the DirAC method and the Harpex method.

Irregular Layout Decoders 

The Rapture3D decoder from Blue Ripple Sound supports this and is already used in a number of computer games using OpenAL.

See also 

 Ambisonics
 Ambisonic UHJ format: Decoding UHJ
 Meridian Audio, Ltd., manufacturer of hardware decoders

References

External links 
 Ambisonic Surround Sound FAQ (Sections 17 and 18 for hardware decoders)
 Ambisonia website Bruce Wiggins's WAD decoders for 4.0, 6.0 and 8.0 are nearly Classic Ambisonic Decoders and easy to use plugins for Windows Media Player.
 B2X Plug-Ins B2D, B2G and B2Stereo software decoders, in VST and Audio Unit formats, for Mac OS X
 Shelf Filters and Distance Compensation "Ambisonic Surround Decoder" and "SHELF FILTERS for Ambisonic Decoders" explain these important features of Classic Ambisonic Decoders for those designing software decoders
 Harpex Ltd (for stand-alone and plug-in versions of the Harpex method)
 Blue Ripple Sound Limited Rapture3D and TOA regular and irregular speaker decoders, binaural stereo and more.

Sound production technology
Decoding